Caroline M. Woodward may refer to:

 Caroline M. Clark Woodward (1840–1924), American temperance worker
 Caroline Marshall Woodward (1828–1890), American author